Arne Kristian Billkvam (born 7 April 1960) is a former Norwegian ice hockey player. He was born in Oslo, Norway. He played for the Norwegian national ice hockey team at the 1988, 1992 and 1994 Winter Olympics.

References

1960 births
Ice hockey players at the 1988 Winter Olympics
Ice hockey players at the 1992 Winter Olympics
Ice hockey players at the 1994 Winter Olympics
Living people
Norwegian ice hockey players
Olympic ice hockey players of Norway
Ice hockey people from Oslo
Vålerenga Ishockey players